Adams Mills, Michigan is a populated place in Branch County, Michigan.  It was established in 1831 by Wales Adams at the point where the road to Chicago crossed the Prairie River.

References

Populated places established in 1831
Populated places in Branch County, Michigan